Van Charles Snowden (February 19, 1939 – September 22, 2010) was an American puppeteer active in the film and television industries for decades. Snowden performed as the H.R. Pufnstuf character on nearly every episode of the television series of the same name from 1969 to 1971. His other credits included the horror films Child's Play 2 and Child's Play 3, Tales from the Crypt and D.C. Follies.

Life and career
Snowden was born in San Francisco, California, in 1939. He was raised in Branson, Missouri, on a farm.

Snowden launched his professional career by performing as the title character of H.R. Pufnstuf, which was created by Sid and Marty Krofft, from 1969 until 1971. He also performed as H.R. Pufnstuf in Pufnstuf, which was a spinoff of the television series and as a segment of the Second season of the Banana Splits Adventure Hour, which premiered a year prior in 1968 by NBC & Sid & Marty Krofft. He continued to collaborate with Sid and Marty Krofft on a number of their other productions, including Land of the Lost, Sigmund and the Sea Monsters, Lidsville and The Bugaloos. Additionally, Snowden toured with The Pufnstuf Road Show for two years, and made an appearance in the lesser known series Mother Goose's Treasury.

In 1989, Snowden and other puppeteers were nominated for an Emmy Award for Outstanding Performance in a Variety or Musical Program at the 41st Primetime Emmy Awards for their work on D.C. Follies. The nomination marked the first time that the Primetime Emmy Awards had honored puppeteers in their history. However, Snowden and the cast of D.C. Follies lost to singer Linda Ronstadt, who won for her performance on Great Performances on PBS that year.

Snowden also assisted with the puppetry for the character Chucky in the horror films Child's Play 2 (1990) and Child's Play 3 (1991). His other film credits included work on Beetlejuice (1988), Bill & Ted's Bogus Journey (1991), Dracula (1992), Alien Resurrection (1997), Starship Troopers (1997) and The X-Files (1988). During the 1980s, Snowden became the lead puppeteer on the television series Pee-wee's Playhouse. He also performed the puppetry for The Crypt Keeper on Tales from the Crypt, an anthology series which aired from 1989 until 1996.

His last television credit was as H.R. Pufnstuf on an episode of My Name is Earl in 2007.

Snowden also worked for the puppeteer division of Hasbro and its Tiger Electronics division. He was part of the puppetry and programming team which developed the body, mouth and eye movements for such interactive toys as Furby, E.T., Gizmo and Yoda. Snowden headed Hasbro's puppeteer division for the last three years of his life and career.

Van Snowden died from cancer on September 22, 2010, at St. Joseph's Hospital in Burbank, California, at the age of 71. He was survived by his brother, Nick, and sister, Deanna.

Van was the son of Wyatt Estes Snowden and Ortha Dufree.

Filmography
Pufnstuf (1970)
The Bugaloos (1970–1971) - Tweeter
Lidsville (1971–1972) - Tonsolini the Opera Hat, Pierre de Sewer, Pufnstuf
Fol-de-Rol (1972) - Puppeteer
The NBC Saturday Morning Preview Revue (1974) - Petey the Peacock
Sigmund and the Sea Monsters (1973–1974) - Sweet Mama Ooze, Dr. Cyclops, The Wolfman
Land of the Lost (1975) - Zarn
The Brady Bunch Variety Hour (1977) - Cher Crow, H.R. Pufnstuf
The Bay City Rollers Meet the Saturday Superstars (1978) - Various characters
The Hanna-Barbera Happy Hour (1978) - Head puppeteer
Barbara Mandrell and the Mandrell Sisters (1980) - Puppeteer
The Hoboken Chicken Emergency (1984) - Henrietta (in-suit performer)
The Patti LaBelle Show (1985) - Puppeteer
Dumbo's Circus (1985) - Assistant puppeteer
D.C. Follies (1987) - Assistant puppet builder 
The Mother Goose Video Treasury (1987) - Humpty Dumpty, Townsperson of Gooseberry Glen
Beetlejuice (1988) - Puppeteer
Redeye Express (1988) - Puppeteer
Pee-wee's Playhouse (1988) - Puppet operator, puppet supervisor
Christmas at Pee Wee's Playhouse (1988) - Puppet operator
Tales from the Crypt (1989–1995) - Puppeteer of Crypt Keeper
Child's Play 2 (1990) - Additional puppeteer of Chucky
Child's Play 3 (1991) - Additional puppeteer of Chucky
Bill & Ted's Bogus Journey (1991) - Puppeteer 
Bram Stoker's Dracula (1992) - Additional puppeteer
Toby Terrier and His Video Pals (1993) - Head puppeteer
Casper (1995) - Puppeteer of Crypt Keeper
Bordello of Blood (1996) - Puppeteer of Crypt Keeper
The X Files (1998) - Puppeteer
My Name Is Earl (2007) - H.R. Pufnstuf

References

External links
 
 

1939 births
2010 deaths
American puppeteers
People from San Francisco
People from Branson, Missouri